Csibrák is a village in Tolna County, Hungary, once settled by Danube Swabians.
Around 1865 - 1880, several Danube Swabian from the Tolna settled in Slavonia, several families from Csibrák went to Slavonia and settled there.

References

Populated places in Tolna County